Germainia is a genus of Chinese, Asian and Australian plants in the grass family.

Species
List of major Germainia species:
 Germainia capitata Balansa & Poitr. - Guangdong, Yunnan, Vietnam, Thailand, New Guinea, Queensland
 Germainia grandiflora (S.T.Blake) Chai-Anan - Queensland, Northern Territory
 Germainia khasyana Hack. - Assam, Myanmar, Thailand
 Germainia lanipes Hook.f. - Myanmar, Thailand
 Germainia pilosa Chai-Anan - Thailand
 Germainia tenax (Balansa) Chai-Anan - Cambodia, Laos, Thailand, Vietnam
 Germainia thailandica (Bor) Chai-Anan - Thailand
 Germainia thorelii A.Camus - Laos, Thailand, Vietnam
 Germainia truncatiglumis (F.Muell. ex Benth.) Chai-Anan - Northern Territory, Western Australia, New Guinea

References

Andropogoneae
Poaceae genera
Taxa named by Benjamin Balansa